Bronwyn Lea is a contemporary Australian poet, academic and editor.

Biography

Born in Tasmania, Lea grew up in Queensland and Papua New Guinea, moving to San Diego to study at California State University. She completed a PhD titled "The way into stone; To dwell in possibility: Social roles of the poet" at University of Queensland (UQ) in 2005 and as of 2021 is a full professor and head of the School of Communication and Arts at UQ.

She was a member of the Literature Board of the Australia Council from 2005–2008.

Lea appeared in two events at the 2017 Brisbane Writers Festival in Brisbane, Queensland, Australia.

Published works

Poetry
 The Deep North: A selection of poems (George Braziller, 2013)
The Other Way Out. (Giramondo Publishing, 2008)
 The Wooden Cat and Other Poems. (Picaro P, 2003)
 Flight Animals. (University of Queensland Press, 2001) 

Series Editor (with Martin Duwell)
 The Best Australian Poetry. University of Queensland Press

Awards
 John Bray Poetry Award Adelaide Festival Awards for Literature, 2010, winner for The Other Way Out
 C. J. Dennis Prize for Poetry, 2010, shortlisted for The Other Way Out
 Judith Wright Calanthe Award for Poetry, 2008, shortlisted for The Other Way Out
 Western Australian Premier's Book Awards for Poetry, 2008, winner for The Other Way Out
 The Vincent Buckley Poetry Prize, 2006, University of Melbourne
 Wesley Michel Wright Prize for Poetry, 2001—winner for Flight Animals
 Fellowship of Australian Writers Anne Elder Award, 2002—winner for Flight Animals
 John Bray Poetry Award ] Adelaide Festival Awards for Literature, 2002—shortlisted for Flight Animals
 Colin Roderick Award, 2002—special mention for Flight Animals
 Judith Wright Calanthe Award for Poetry, 2002—shortlisted for Flight Animals
 Kenneth Slessor Prize for Poetry, 2002—shortlisted for Flight Animals

References

External links
 Bronwyn Lea's website
 Bronywn Lea Contents page Poems and reviews at Australian Literary Resources
 4 poems at Drunken Boat
 Insufficient Knowledge Poem
 Interview at ReadersVoice.com

1969 births
Australian poets
Living people
Australian women poets